The Cucamonga Winery was started by Alfred Accomazzo and his brother Eduardo Accomazzo in 1933, and located near the intersection of Rochester and Arrow Hwy. The Cucamonga Winery is closely connected with the founding of the city of Cucamonga, California. A California Historical Landmark marker was placed at Cucamonga Winery in Cucamonga, California, marking the spot of the Historical Rancho Cucamonga. 

The Accomazzo brothers came to the United States from San Desiderio in the Asti region of Piedmont in northwest Italy in 1902. The Accomazzo brothers, as young men first lived and worked in San Francisco then in 1916 moved to Glendale, California. In Glendale they operated a Winery. They switch to working in real estate during prohibition in the United States.  After prohibition they went back to wine making, but this time in Cucamonga. In 1933 Alfred Accomazzo started the Cucamonga Winery. The Cucamonga area was designated Cucamonga Valley AVA American Viticultural Area for its grape and wine production. Alfred partnered with Dominic Merlo, Mary Pastrone and Louis Gotto to open the Cucamonga Winery. They repurchased land and plated vineyards. Louis Gotto sold his share in the winery to Joseph Ettor in 1935. Joseph Ettor expanded the market of the vine, making it famous. Distribution started in New York, Connecticut, Massachusetts, Vermont, Illinois and Ohio. Eduardo son, Ed Accomazzo, startedwor at the in 1950.  After Alfred Accomazzo died in 1960, his son, Arthur took over his work. At it peak the winery farmed   around Cucamonga. Due to high property taxes most of the Cucamonga vineyards were sold. In 1975 the Cucamonga Winery closed. Ed Accomazzo continued run the Cucamonga winery in Upland, California.

Markers
Marker at Cucamonga Winery, about Cucamonga Rancho, noting Tiburcio Tapia [(incorrect, this Marker is at the Thomas Winery located at 8916 Foothill Blvd. Cucamonga.)], site reads: 
Established by Tiburcio Tapia, to whom the Cucamonga Rancho was granted March 3, 1839, by Governor Juan Bautista Alvarado of Mexico.

See also
California Historical Landmarks in San Bernardino County, California

References

 
Defunct California wineries